Milton Berle (born Mendel Berlinger; ; July 12, 1908 – March 27, 2002) was an American actor and comedian. His career as an entertainer spanned over 80 years, first in silent films and on stage as a child actor, then in radio, movies and television. As the host of NBC's Texaco Star Theatre (1948–1953), he was the first major American television star and was known to millions of viewers as "Uncle Miltie" and "Mr. Television" during the first Golden Age of Television. He was honored with two stars on the Hollywood Walk of Fame for his work in both radio and TV.

Early life
Milton Berle was born into a Jewish family in a five-story walkup at 68 W. 118th Street in the Harlem neighborhood of Manhattan. His given name was Mendel Berlinger, but he chose Milton Berle as his professional name when he was 16. His father, Moses Berlinger (1872–1938), was a paint and varnish salesman. His mother, Sarah (Sadie) Glantz Berlinger (1877–1954), changed her name to Sandra Berle when Milton became famous. He had three older brothers (from oldest to youngest): Phil, Frank, and Jack Berle. For many years, the latter two worked on Berle's TV production staff while Phil was a programming executive at NBC.

Child actor
Berle entered show business in 1913 at the age of five when he won a children's Charlie Chaplin contest.   He also worked as a child model and was "Buster Brown" for "Buster Brown" shoes. He appeared as a child actor in silent films. He claimed The Perils of Pauline as his first film appearance, playing the character of a young boy, though this has never been independently verified. In Milton Berle: An Autobiography, he explained that the director told him he would portray a little boy who would be thrown from a moving train. He said, "I was scared shitless, even when he went on to tell me that Pauline would save my life. This is exactly what happened, except that at the crucial moment they threw a bundle of rags instead of me from the train. I bet there are a lot of comedians around today who are sorry about that."

By Berle's account, he continued to play child roles in other films: Bunny's Little Brother, Tess of the Storm Country, Birthright, Love's Penalty, Divorce Coupons, and Ruth of the Range. Berle recalled, "There were even trips out to Hollywood—the studios paid—where I got parts in Rebecca of Sunnybrook Farm, with Mary Pickford; The Mark of Zorro, with Douglas Fairbanks, Sr.; and Tillie's Punctured Romance, with Charlie Chaplin, Mabel Normand, and Marie Dressler." However, Berle's claim to have appeared in Tillie's Punctured Romance has been disputed by film historians including Glenn Mitchell, who in his book, The Chaplin Encyclopedia, writes that Berle's alleged role was most likely played by child actor Gordon Griffith.

In 1916, Berle enrolled in the Professional Children's School.

Career

Vaudeville
Around 1920 at age 12, Berle made his stage debut in a revival of the musical comedy Florodora in Atlantic City, New Jersey, which later moved to Broadway. By the time he was 16, he was working as a master of ceremonies in vaudeville. He is also known to have played small bit parts in several silent films in the 1910s and 1920s, though his presence in some is disputed (see Filmography, below). In 1932, he starred in Earl Carrol's "Vanities," a Broadway musical. By the early 1930s, he was a successful stand-up comedian, patterning himself after one of vaudeville's top comics, Ted Healy.

Rising star
In 1933, Berle was hired by producer Jack White to star in the theatrical featurette Poppin' the Cork, a topical musical comedy concerning the repealing of Prohibition. Berle also co-wrote the score for this film, which was released by Educational Pictures. Berle continued to dabble in songwriting: with Ben Oakland and Milton Drake, he wrote the title song for the RKO Radio Pictures release Li'l Abner (1940), an adaptation of Al Capp's comic strip, featuring Buster Keaton as Lonesome Polecat. Berle wrote a Spike Jones B-side, "Leave the Dishes in the Sink, Ma."

Radio
From 1934 to 1936, Berle appeared frequently on The Rudy Vallee Hour and attracted publicity as a regular on The Gillette Original Community Sing, a Sunday night comedy-variety program broadcast on CBS from September 6, 1936, to August 29, 1937. In 1939, he was the host of Stop Me If You've Heard This One with panelists spontaneously finishing jokes sent in by listeners.

In the late 1940s, he canceled well-paying nightclub appearances to expand his radio career. Three Ring Time, a comedy-variety show sponsored by Ballantine Ale, was followed by a 1943 program sponsored by Campbell's Soups. The audience participation show Let Yourself Go (1944–1945) could best be described as "slapstick radio" with studio audience members acting out long-suppressed urges—often directed at host Berle. Kiss and Make Up on CBS in 1946 featured the problems of contestants decided by a jury from the studio audience with Berle as the judge. Berle also made guest appearances on many comedy-variety radio programs during the 1930s and 1940s.

Scripted by Hal Block and Martin Ragaway, The Milton Berle Show also featured Arnold Stang, later a familiar face as Berle's TV sidekick. Others in the cast were Pert Kelton, Mary Schipp, Jack Albertson, Arthur Q. Bryan, Ed Begley, Brazilian singer Dick Farney, and announcer Frank Gallop. Sponsored by Philip Morris, it aired on NBC from March 11, 1947, until April 13, 1948.

Berle later described this series as "the best radio show I ever did ... a hell of a funny variety show." It served as a springboard for Berle's emergence as television's first major star.

Mr. Television
Berle first appeared on television in 1929 in an experimental broadcast in Chicago which he hosted in front of 129 people. He would return to television 20 years later.

Berle would revive the structure and routines of his vaudeville act for his debut on commercial TV, hosting The Texaco Star Theatre on June 8, 1948, over the NBC Television Network.  They did not settle on Berle as the permanent host right away; he was originally part of a rotation of hosts (Berle himself had only a four-week contract). Jack Carter was the host for August. Berle was named the permanent host that fall. Berle's highly visual style, characterized by vaudeville slapstick and outlandish costumes, proved ideal for the new medium. Berle modeled the show's structure and skits directly from his vaudeville shows and hired writer Hal Collins to revive his old routines.

Berle dominated Tuesday night television for the next several years, reaching the number one slot in the Nielsen ratings with as much as a 97% share of the viewing audience. Berle and the show each won Emmy Awards after the first season. Fewer movie tickets were sold on Tuesdays. Some theaters, restaurants, and other businesses shut down for the hour or closed for the evening so their customers would not miss Berle's antics. Berle's autobiography notes that in Detroit, "an investigation took place when the water levels took a drastic drop in the reservoirs on Tuesday nights between 9 and 9:05. It turned out that everyone waited until the end of the Texaco Star Theatre before going to the bathroom."

Television sales more than doubled after Texaco Star Theatres debut, reaching two million in 1949. Berle's stature as the medium's first superstar earned him the sobriquet "Mr. Television". He also earned another nickname after ending a 1949 broadcast with a brief ad-libbed remark to children watching the show: "Listen to your Uncle Miltie and go to bed." Francis Craig and Kermit Goell's Near You became the theme song that closed Berle's TV shows.

Berle risked his newfound TV stardom at its zenith to challenge Texaco when the sponsor tried to prevent black performers from appearing on his show:

I remember clashing with the advertising agency and the sponsor over my signing the Four Step Brothers for an appearance on the show. The only thing I could figure out was that there was an objection to black performers on the show, but I couldn't even find out who was objecting. "We just don't like them," I was told, but who the hell was "we?" Because I was riding high in 1950, I sent out the word: "If they don't go on, I don't go on." At ten minutes of eight—minutes before showtime—I got permission for the Step Brothers to appear. If I broke the color-line policy or not, I don't know, but later on, I had no trouble booking Bill Robinson or Lena Horne.

Berle's mother, Sadie, was often in the audience for his broadcasts; she had long served as a "plant" to encourage laughter from his stage show audiences. Her unique, "piercing, roof-shaking laugh" would stand out, especially when Berle made an entrance in an outrageous costume. After feigning surprise he would "ad-lib" a response; for example: "Lady, you've got all night to make a fool of yourself. I've only got an hour!"

Berle asked NBC to switch from live broadcasts to film, which would have made possible reruns (and residual income from them); he was angered when the network refused. However, NBC did consent to make a kinescope of each show. Later, Berle was offered 25% ownership of the TelePrompTer Corporation by its inventor, Irving Berlin Kahn, if he would replace cue cards with the new device on his program. He turned down the offer.

A frequent user of tranquilizers, Berle frequently endorsed Miltown on his show and became one of its leading advocates in 1950s America. Due to his promotion of the drug, Berle was dubbed "Uncle Miltown" by Time magazine.

For Berle's contribution to television, he was inducted to the Hollywood Walk of Fame in 1960.

Berle's imperious, abrasive and controlling manner on the show was the inspiration for the 1957 CBS Playhouse 90 production of "The Comedian". starring Mickey Rooney as egomanaical TV comic Sammy Hogarth, who ran his weekly show through explosive tantrums, intimidation, bullying and cruelty.  Writer Ernest Lehman had been assigned to profile Berle for a magazine, and captured Berle's high-handedness so completely that the magazine declined to run it, but suggested he fictionalize it and recast it as a novella. When it was picked up for the show, Rod Serling wrote the teleplay. John Frankenheimer directed the live production which received considerable acclaim.  The cast included Edmond O'Brien, Kim Hunter and jazz singer Mel Torme in his first dramatic role, portraying Hogarth's spineless brother Lester.  While some speculated the play was based on Jackie Gleason's loud, controlling personality, Berle, aware the production echoed his own reputation, was quoted as saying, "I wasn't that bad."  The episode won two Emmy Awards.

TV decline
In 1951, NBC signed Berle to an unprecedented 30-year exclusive television contract at a million dollars a year.

In 1953, Texaco pulled out of sponsorship of the show but Buick picked it up, prompting a renaming as The Buick-Berle Show. The program's format was changed to include the backstage preparations for the variety show. Critics generally approved of the changes, but Berle's ratings continued to fall, and Buick pulled out after two seasons. In addition, "Berle's persona had shifted from the impetuous and aggressive style of the Texaco Star Theater days to a more cultivated but less distinctive personality, leaving many fans somehow unsatisfied."

By the time the again-renamed Milton Berle Show finished its only full season (1955–56), Berle was already becoming history—though his final season was host to two of Elvis Presley's earliest television appearances, April 3 and June 5, 1956. The final straw during that last season may have come from CBS scheduling The Phil Silvers Show opposite Berle. Silvers was one of Berle's best friends in show business and had come to CBS's attention in an appearance on Berle's program. Bilko's creator-producer, Nat Hiken, had been one of Berle's radio writers.

Berle knew that NBC had already decided to cancel his show before Presley appeared. He later hosted the first television version of the popular radio variety series, The Kraft Music Hall  from 1958 to 1959, but NBC was finding increasingly fewer showcases for its one-time superstar. By 1960, he was reduced to hosting a bowling program, Jackpot Bowling, delivering his quips and interviewing celebrities between the efforts of that week's bowling contestants.

Life after The Milton Berle Show

In Las Vegas, Berle played to packed showrooms at Caesars Palace, the Sands, the Desert Inn, and other casino hotels. Berle had appeared at the El Rancho, one of the first Vegas hotels, in the late 1940s. In addition to constant club appearances, Berle performed on Broadway in Herb Gardner's The Goodbye People in 1968. He also became a commercial spokesman for the thriving Lum's restaurant chain.

He appeared in numerous films, including Always Leave Them Laughing (released in 1949, shortly after his TV debut) with Virginia Mayo and Bert Lahr;Let's Make Love with Marilyn Monroe and Yves Montand; It's a Mad, Mad, Mad, Mad World; The Loved One; The Oscar; Who's Minding the Mint?; Lepke; Woody Allen's Broadway Danny Rose; and Driving Me Crazy.

Freed in part from the obligations of his NBC contract, Berle was signed in 1966 to a new weekly variety series on ABC. The show failed to capture a large audience and was canceled after one season. He later appeared as guest villain Louie the Lilac on ABC's Batman series. Other appearances included stints on The Barbara Stanwyck Show, The Lucy Show, The Jackie Gleason Show, Get Smart, Laugh-In, The Sonny & Cher Comedy Hour, The Hollywood Palace, Ironside, F Troop, Fantasy Island, The Mod Squad, I Dream of Jeannie, CHiPs, The Muppet Show, and The Jack Benny Program.

Like his contemporary Jackie Gleason, Berle proved a solid dramatic actor and was acclaimed for several such performances, most notably his lead role in "Doyle Against the House" on The Dick Powell Show in 1961, a role for which he received an Emmy nomination. He also played the part of a blind survivor of an airplane crash in Seven in Darkness, the first in ABC's Movie of the Week series. He also played a dramatic role as a talent agent in The Oscar (1966) and was one of the few actors in that movie to get good notices from critics.

During this period, Berle was named to the Guinness Book of World Records for the greatest number of charity performances made by a show-business performer. Unlike the high-profile shows done by Bob Hope to entertain the troops, Berle did more shows, over a period of 50 years, on a lower-profile basis. Berle received an award for entertaining at stateside military bases in World War I as a child performer, in addition to traveling to foreign bases during World War II and the Vietnam War. The first charity telethon (for the Damon Runyon Cancer Research Foundation) was hosted by Berle in 1949. A permanent fixture at charity benefits in the Hollywood area, he was instrumental in raising millions for charitable causes.

Late career
On April 14, 1979, Berle guest-hosted NBC's Saturday Night Live. Berle's long reputation for taking control of an entire television production—whether invited to do so or not—was a cause of stress on the set. In addition, he appeared skeptical about the show's satirical bent. One of the show's writers, Rosie Shuster, described the rehearsals for the Berle SNL show and the telecast as "watching a comedy train accident in slow motion on a loop." Upstaging, camera mugging, doing spit-takes, inserting old comedy bits, and climaxing the show with a maudlin performance of "September Song" complete with a pre-arranged standing ovation (something producer Lorne Michaels had never sanctioned) resulted in Berle being banned from hosting the show again. The episode was also barred from being rerun until surfacing in 2003 because Michaels thought it brought down the show's reputation.

As a guest star on The Muppet Show,  Berle was memorably upstaged by the heckling theater critics Statler and Waldorf.  The Statler and Waldorf puppets were inspired by a character named Sidney Spritzer, played by comedian Irving Benson, who regularly heckled Berle from a box seat during episodes of the 1960s ABC series. Milton Berle also made a cameo appearance in The Muppet Movie as a used car dealer, taking Fozzie Bear's 1951 Studebaker in trade for a station wagon. 

In 1974, Berle had a minor altercation with a younger actor/comedian Richard Pryor when both appeared as guests on The Mike Douglas Show. At the time, Berle was discussing the emotional fallout from an experience he had with impregnating a woman with whom he was not married, having to then decide whether or not they would keep the child. During his talk, Pryor let out a laugh, to which Berle took exception and confronted him, stating, "I wish, I wish, Richard, that I could have laughed at that time at your age when I was your age, the way you just laughed now, but I just couldn't ... I told you this nine years ago, and now I'll tell you on the air in front of millions of people: Pick your spots, baby." This prompted Pryor to mockingly quip back, "All right, sweetheart" in a Humphrey Bogart voice.

Another well-known incident of upstaging occurred during the 1982 Emmy Awards, when Berle and Martha Raye were the presenters of the Emmy for Outstanding Writing. Berle was reluctant to give up the microphone to the award's recipients from Second City Television and interrupted actor/writer Joe Flaherty's acceptance speech several times. After Flaherty made a joke, Berle replied sarcastically, "That's funny!" However, Flaherty's response of "Sorry, Uncle Miltie ... go to sleep," flustered Berle. SCTV later created a parody sketch of the incident, in which Flaherty beats up a Berle look-alike, shouting, "You'll never ruin another acceptance speech, Uncle Miltie!"

In 1984, Berle appeared in drag in the video for "Round and Round" by the 1980s metal band Ratt (his nephew Marshall Berle was then their manager). He also made a brief appearance in the band's "Back For More" video as a motorcyclist.

In 1985, he appeared on NBC's Amazing Stories (created by Steven Spielberg) in the episode "Fine Tunin'". In it, friendly aliens from space receive TV signals from the Earth of the 1950s and travel to Hollywood in search of their idols, Lucille Ball, Jackie Gleason, The Three Stooges, Burns and Allen, and Milton Berle. When Berle realizes the aliens are doing his old material, Uncle Miltie is thunderstruck: "Stealing from Berle? Is that even possible?" Speaking gibberish, Berle is the only person able to communicate directly with the aliens.

One of the most popular performances in his later years was guest-starring in 1992 in The Fresh Prince of Bel-Air as womanizing, wise-cracking patient Max Jakey. Most of his dialogue was improvized and he shocked the studio audience by mistakenly blurting out a curse word. He also appeared in an acclaimed and Emmy-nominated turn on Beverly Hills, 90210 as an aging comedian befriended by Steve Sanders, who idolizes him, but is troubled by his bouts of senility due to Alzheimer's disease. He also voiced the Prince of Darkness, the main antagonist in the Canadian animated television anthology special The Real Story of Au Clair De La Lune. He appeared in 1995 as a guest star in an episode of The Nanny as her lawyer and great uncle.

In 1994, Berle released a fitness videotape titled "Milton Berle's Low Impact/High Comedy Workout" which was targeted towards seniors.

Berle was again on the receiving end of an onstage gibe at the 1993 MTV Video Music Awards when RuPaul responded to Berle's reference of having once worn dresses himself (during his old television days) with the quip that Berle now wore diapers. A surprised Berle replied by recycling a line he had delivered to Henny Youngman on his Hollywood Palace show in 1966: "Oh, we're going to ad lib? I'll check my brain and we'll start even."

Berle offstage

In 1947, Milton Berle was one of the founding members of the Friars Club of Beverly Hills at the old Savoy Hotel on Sunset Boulevard. In 1961, the club moved to Beverly Hills. The Friars is a private show business club famous for its celebrity members and roasts, where a member is mocked by his club friends in good fun.

Berle avoided consuming drugs and alcohol, but was an avid cigar smoker, womanizer, and gambler; primarily gambling on horse racing. His enjoyment of the latter may have been responsible for Berle never equaling the wealth of many of his contemporaries.

Berle was famous within show business for the rumored size of his penis.  Phil Silvers once told a story about standing next to Berle at a urinal, glancing down, and quipping, "You'd better feed that thing, or it's liable to turn on you!"  In the short story "A Beautiful Child", Truman Capote wrote Marilyn Monroe as saying: "Christ! Everybody says Milton Berle has the biggest schlong in Hollywood."  At a memorial service for Berle at the New York Friars' Club, Freddie Roman solemnly announced, "On May 1st and May 2nd, his penis will be buried." Radio shock jock Howard Stern barraged Berle with an endless array of penis questions during his appearances on Stern's morning talk show in 1988 and 1996. In Berle's 1988 appearance, when fielding phone calls, Stern purposely asked his producer to only air callers whose questions dealt with Berle's penis. In his autobiography, Berle tells of a man who accosted him in a steam bath and challenged him to compare sizes, leading a bystander to remark, "Go ahead, Milton, just take out enough to win." Berle attributed this line to comedian Jackie Gleason and said: "It was maybe the funniest spontaneous line I ever heard." In the oral history "Live From New York: An Uncensored History of Saturday Night Live", SNL writer Alan Zweibel describes how Berle opened his bathrobe in his dressing room to show his penis size to Zweibel, only to have cast member Gilda Radner walk in on the uncomfortable scene.

Though Berle "worked clean" for his entire career, excepting the Friars Club private celebrity roasts, he reportedly used profane language extensively in private.

Personal life

After twice marrying and divorcing showgirl Joyce Mathews, Berle married publicist Ruth Cosgrove in 1953; she died of cancer in 1989. In 1989, Berle stated that his mother was behind the breakup of his marriages to Mathews. He also said that she managed to damage his previous relationships: "My mother never resented me going out with a girl, but if I had more than three dates with one girl, Mama found some way to break it up." He married a fourth time in 1992 to Lorna Adams, a fashion designer 30 years his junior. He had three children, Victoria (adopted by Berle and Mathews), William (adopted by Berle and Cosgrove) and a biological son, Bob Williams, with showgirl Junior Standish (née Jean Dunne Arthur; 1925–2006). Berle had two stepdaughters from his marriage to Adams: Leslie and Susan Brown. He also had three grandchildren: Victoria's sons James and Mathew, and William's son Tyler Daniel Roe, who died in 2014.

Berle's autobiography contains many tales of his sexual exploits. He claimed relationships with numerous famous women including Marilyn Monroe and Betty Hutton, columnist Dorothy Kilgallen, and evangelist Aimee Semple McPherson.  The veracity of some of these claims has been questioned. The McPherson story, in particular, has been challenged by McPherson's biographer and her daughter, among others.

In later life, Berle found comfort in Christian Science and subsequently characterized himself as "a Jew and a Christian Scientist." Oscar Levant, when queried by Jack Paar about Berle's adoption of Christian Science, quipped, "Our loss is their loss."

Berle endorsed Lyndon B. Johnson in the 1964 United States presidential election.

Final role and death

Berle guest-starred as Uncle Leo in the Kenan & Kel special "Two Heads Are Better than None", which premiered in 2000. This would be his last acting role.

In April 2001, Berle announced that a malignant tumor had been found in his colon, but he had declined surgery. Berle's wife said the tumor was growing so slowly that it would take 10 to 12 years to affect him in any significant or life-threatening way. However, one year after the announcement, on March 27, 2002, Berle died in Los Angeles from colon cancer. He died on the same day as Dudley Moore and Billy Wilder.

Berle reportedly left arrangements to be buried with his second wife, Ruth, at Mount Sinai Memorial Park Cemetery in Burbank, but his body was cremated and interred at Hillside Memorial Park Cemetery in Culver City. (Warren Cowan, Berle's publicist, told The New York Times, "I only know he told me he bought plots at Hillside, and it was his idea.") In addition to his third wife, Lorna Adams, Berle was survived by his three children and extended family.

Honors and awards
Berle won the Emmy for Most Outstanding Kinescoped Personality in 1950, the same year his show, the Texaco Star Theater, won the Emmy for Best Kinescope Show. He was twice nominated for Emmys for his acting, in 1962 and 1995. In 1979, Berle was awarded a special Emmy Award, titled "Mr. Television."
 The Hollywood Walk of Fame, on February 8, 1960, inducted Berle with two stars, for television and radio.
 Berle was in the first group of inductees into the Television Hall of Fame in 1984.
 On December 5, 2007, California Governor Arnold Schwarzenegger and First Lady Maria Shriver inducted Berle into the California Hall of Fame, located at The California Museum for History, Women and the Arts.

Broadway
Earl Carroll's Vanities of 1932 (1932) – revue – in the roles of "Mortimer" in the sketch "Mourning Becomes Impossible", "Joe Miller, Jr." in "What Price Jokes", "Frank" in "Two Sailors", "Paul" in "The Cabinet of Doctor X", the "Announcer" in "Studio W.M.C.A." the "Defendant" in "Trial by Jury" and "Milton" in "The Bar Relief"
Saluta (1934) – musical – co-lyricist and performer cast in the role of "'Windy' Walker"
See My Lawyer (1939) – play – performer cast in the role of "Arthur Lee"
Ziegfeld Follies of 1943 (1943) – revue – performer in the role of "Cecil" in Counter Attack, "J. Pierswift Armour" in The Merchant of Venison, "Perry Johnson" in Loves-A-Poppin, "Escamillio" in Carmen in Zoot, "Charlie Grant" Mr Grant Goes To Washington, "'The Micromaniac' Singer" and  "'Hold That Smile' Dancer"
I'll Take the High Road (1943) – play – co-producer
Seventeen (1951) – musical – co-producer
The Goodbye People (1968) – performer cast in the role of "Max Silverman"

Selected filmography

1914: The Perils of Pauline (credit disputed)
1915: Fanchon the Cricket as Bit Role (uncredited)
1917: Rebecca of Sunnybrook Farm as Bit Part (uncredited)
1920: Birthright
1920: The Mark of Zorro as Boy (uncredited)
1921: Little Lord Fauntleroy as Boy (uncredited)
1922: Tess of the Storm Country as Bit Role (uncredited)
1923: Ruth of the Range as Bit Role (uncredited)
1933: Poppin' the Cork as Elmer Brown
1937: New Faces of 1937 as Wallington Wedge
1938: Radio City Revels as Teddy Jordan
1940: Li'l Abner (title song with Ben Oakland and Milton Drake)
1941: Tall, Dark and Handsome as Frosty Welch
1941: The Great American Broadcast as Radio Announcer (scenes deleted)
1941: Sun Valley Serenade as Nifty Allen
1941: Rise and Shine as Seabiscuit
1942: A Gentleman at Heart  as Lucky Cullen
1942: Whispering Ghosts as H.H. Van Buren
1942: Over My Dead Body as Jason Cordry
1943: Margin for Error as Moe Finkelstein
1949: Always Leave Them Laughing as Kipling 'Kip' Cooper
1959: Lucy-Desi Comedy Hour "Milton Berle Hides Out at The Ricardos'" as himself
1960: The Bellboy as himself / Bellboy (uncredited)
1960: Let's Make Love as himself (uncredited)
1961: The Ladies Man (1961) as himself (scenes deleted)
1963: It's a Mad, Mad, Mad, Mad World as J. Russell Finch
1965: The Loved One as Mr. Kenton
1966: The Oscar as Kappy Kapstetter
1966: Don't Worry, We'll Think of a Title as Bookstore Customer with Rope (uncredited)
1967: The Happening as Fred
1967: Who's Minding the Mint? as Luther Burton
1967: The Big Valley (Season 3, Episode 3, A Flock of Trouble) as Josiah Freeman
1967: Batman (Season 3, Episode 7, "Louie the Lilac") as Louie the Lilac
1968: Where Angels Go, Trouble Follows as The Movie Director: The 'In' Group
1968: For Singles Only as Mr Parker
1969: Can Heironymus Merkin Ever Forget Mercy Humppe and Find True Happiness? as Goodtime Eddie Filth
1969: Seven in Darkness as Sam Fuller
1971: That Girl (Season 5, Episode 15, Those Friars) as himself
1972: Evil Roy Slade as Harry Fern
1972: Journey Back to Oz as The Cowardly Lion (voice)
1975: Lepke as Mr. Meyer
1976: Won Ton Ton, the Dog Who Saved Hollywood as Blind Man
1976: Let's Make a Deal (playing for a home viewer)
1978: Hey, Abbott! as himself (voice)
1979: The Muppet Movie as Mad Man Mooney
1980: CHiPs as himself
1983: Cracking Up as Ms. Sultry
1984: Broadway Danny Rose as himself
1984: The 1st TV Academy Hall of Fame as himself/winner
1984: Music Video with Ratt & Milton Berle, Round and round
1985: Pee-wee's Big Adventure as himself (uncredited)
1985: Amazing Stories as himself
1988: Side by Side as Abe Mercer
1989: Going Overboard as himself (uncredited)
1991: Trabbi Goes to Hollywood as Hotel Clerk
1991: Shakes the Clown as Male Clown Barfly (uncredited)
1992: The Fresh Prince of Bel-Air as Max Jakey
1992: The Real Story of Au Clair De La Lune as The Prince of Darkness (voice)
1993: Matlock "The Last Laugh" as Harvey Chase 
1995: Beverly Hills, 90210 as Saul Howard
1995: The Nanny as Uncle Manny
1995: Roseanne as Transvestite at Wedding (uncredited)
1995: The 4th of July Parade as Ice Cream Man
1996: Storybook as Illuzor
1996: Sister, Sister (TV Series) The Volunteers as Edgar Boggs
2000: Two Heads Are Better Than None as Uncle Leo (final film role)

References

Further reading
Berle, Milton with Haskel Frankel. Milton Berle, an Autobiography. New York: Dell, 1975. 
Dunning, John. On The Air: The Encyclopedia of Old-Time Radio, Oxford University Press, 1998. 
McNeil, Alex. Total Television. New York: Penguin Books, 1996. 
Shales, Tom and James Andrew Miller. Live From New York: An Uncensored History of Saturday Night Live. New York: Little, Brown, 2002. 
Berle, William and Lewis, Brad. "My Father, Uncle Miltie". New York: Barricade Books, 1999.

External links

 
 
 
 
 Comedy Central's 100 Greatest Stand-ups of All Time
 Milton Berle Internet archive Several entries for free stream or download including Texaco Star Theater and Buick Berle Show.
 Museum of Broadcast Communications: Milton Berle
 Museum of Broadcast Communications: The Milton Berle Show
 Damon Runyon Cancer Research Foundation
 Milton 'Berlinger' Berle's birth certificate
 Literature on Milton Berle
 Episodes of the 'Milton Berle Show' on Radio at Internet Archive

1908 births
2002 deaths
20th-century American comedians
20th-century American male actors
American Christian Scientists
American male child actors
American male film actors
American male radio actors
American male silent film actors
American male television actors
American stand-up comedians
Bowling broadcasters
Burials at Hillside Memorial Park Cemetery
American burlesque performers
Deaths from cancer in California
Deaths from colorectal cancer
Jewish American male actors
Jewish male comedians
Male actors from New York City
People from Harlem
RCA Victor artists
Vaudeville performers
Comedians from New York City
Jewish American male comedians
Converts to Christian Science from Judaism
American male comedy actors